The Underground Press Syndicate (UPS), later known as the Alternative Press Syndicate (APS), was a network of countercultural newspapers and magazines that operated from 1966 into the late 1970s. As it evolved, the Underground Press Syndicate created an Underground Press Service, and later its own magazine. For many years the Underground Press Syndicate was run by Tom Forcade, who later founded High Times magazine.

UPS members agreed to allow all other members to freely reprint their contents, to exchange gratis subscriptions with each other, and to occasionally print a listing of all UPS newspapers with their addresses. Anyone who agreed to those terms was allowed to join the syndicate. As a result, countercultural news stories, criticism, and cartoons were widely disseminated, and a wealth of content was available to even the most modest start-up paper.

Shortly after the formation of the UPS, the number of underground papers throughout North America expanded dramatically. A UPS roster published in November 1966 listed 14 underground papers — a 1971 roster listed 271 UPS-affiliated papers in the United States, Canada, and Europe. The underground press' combined readership eventually reached into the millions.

History

Formation 

The Underground Press Syndicate was initially formed by the publishers of five early underground papers: the East Village Other (New York City), the Los Angeles Free Press, the Berkeley Barb, The Paper (East Lansing, Michigan), and Fifth Estate (Detroit, Michigan).

The first official UPS gathering was held at the home of the San Francisco Oracle's Michael Bowen in Stinson Beach, California, in March 1967, with some 30 people representing a half-dozen papers in attendance. 

The meeting was chaotic and largely symbolic, and the concept amorphous. It was hoped that the syndicate would sell national advertising space that would run in all five papers, but this never happened. As Thorne Dreyer and Victoria Smith wrote for Liberation News Service (LNS), the formation of UPS was designed "to create the illusion of a giant coordinated network of freaky papers, poised for the kill". But, they added, "this mythical value was to be extremely important: the shoes could be grown into" and the emergence of UPS helped to create a sense of national community and to make the papers feel less isolated in their efforts.

Walter Bowart and John Wilcock of the East Village Other, with Michael Kindman of The Paper took the lead in inviting other papers to join. The San Francisco Oracle, The Rag, and the Illustrated Paper (a psychedelic paper published in Mendocino, California) joined soon afterward, and membership grew rapidly in 1967 as new papers were founded (such as the Chicago Seed) and immediately joined. First-hand coverage of the 1967 Detroit riots in Fifth Estate was one example of material that was widely copied in other papers of the syndicate. 

The first paper in the deep South to join was The Inquisition (Charlotte, North Carolina). Fluxus West, a Fluxus offshoot mostly engaged in mail art and self-publishing activities, founded by Ken Friedman, was also one of the newest UPS members in 1967.

Expansion 
By June 1967, a UPS conference in Iowa City hosted by Middle Earth drew 80 newspaper editors from the U.S. and Canada, including representatives of Liberation News Service. LNS, founded by Marshall Bloom and Ray Mungo that summer, would play an equally important and complementary role in the growth and evolution of the underground press in the United States.

An attempt that summer by Bob Rudnick to coordinate and centralize the UPS at the offices of the East Village Other in New York City failed.

Forcade assumes leadership 
Soon after, Tom Forcade took leadership of the organization, opening an office on West 10th Street in New York City, at which UPS curated the underground press collection for regular microfilming as well as publishing the UPS News Service. 

Offices were relocated to Miami during the summer of 1972 to cover the Democratic and Republican Conventions, both of which were held in that city that summer. 

Under Forcade's leadership, UPS would later also publish the Underground Press Revue.

The UPS and the women's liberation movement 
As the underground press movement evolved, women's liberation, initially a non-issue in the male-dominated underground press, became an increasing focus. The UPS passed the following resolutions at its 1969 conference:

These resolutions were a harbinger of staff rebellions by women that split several papers, including Rat, where the feminist faction seized control of the paper for several issues. A few papers, already weakened by staff burnout, poor finances, and other factors, died in the wake of these schisms, while others lost revenue and circulation by barring sexual content and advertisements, which in any event were increasingly being spun off into tabloid sex papers like Screw.

Underground comix 
Almost from the outset, the Underground Press Syndicate supported and distributed underground comix strips. Cartoonists and strips syndicated by the organization included Robert Crumb, Jay Lynch, Ron Cobb, Frank Stack, and The Mad Peck's Burn of the Week.

Meanwhile, other cartoonists whose work appeared in UPS-member papers, such as the East Village Other and the Berkeley Barb, saw their work widely distributed, eventually leading to success in the underground comix industry. Ironically, however, reprints became popular with publishers because underground artists originally had few claims on their own work. The open-ended permissions given by UPS were exploited by some underground comix publishers, bulking up or entirely filling their own magazines with work whose creators didn't receive any payment even when those publishers made a profit.

UPS becomes the Alternative Press Syndicate 
The explosive growth of the underground press had begun to subside by 1970, and by 1973 the boom was clearly over. After a 1973 meeting of member newspapers in Boulder, Colorado, the name of the syndicate was changed to the Alternative Press Syndicate (APS).

APS members sorely needed revenues, and in 1973, Richard Lasky, ex-Rolling Stone Magazine Advertising Director of the successful San Francisco-based weekly, and Sheldon (Shelly) Schorr of Concert Magazine, published in several cities, created a national advertising media selling company, APSmedia. 

APSmedia placed advertising primarily from record and stereo companies with success, placing more than 350 pages of advertising for many of the publications in the bigger markets in the first year. As cities were in the major markets, it mostly sold ads into publications without the advertisers knowing anything more than the names of the client papers. In 1976, APSmedia dissolved.

Dissolution 
By 1974 most underground newspapers in the U.S. had ceased publication. APS limped along but had gone defunct by 1978; succeeded almost immediately by the Association of Alternative Newsweeklies, founded in Seattle.

Although many of the members of the Underground Press Syndicate/Alternative Press Syndicate were founded when the legendary urban underground papers were already dead or dying, their influence resonated through the 1970s and beyond, in scores of eclectic papers founded in small towns and suburbs. For example, Long Island's Moniebogue Press and Suffolk StreetPapers offer general audiences alternative perspectives on local news and culture, while Akwesasne Notes specializes in Native American politics, including issues of peace and ecology.

See also
 Counterculture of the 1960s
 List of underground newspapers of the 1960s counterculture
 Ray Mungo
 Rip Off Press Syndicate
 Thorne Dreyer
 Underground press

Notes

Further reading
 Wachsberger, Ken, ed. Voices from the Underground (Vol. 2): A Directory of Resources and Sources on the Vietnam Era Underground Press (Mica Press, 1993)  — has article about the Underground Press Syndicate and other period alternative news services

References

External links 
 The Rag and the Underground Press Syndicate. — in a letter dated October 5, 1966, Thorne Dreyer announces the birth of The Rag to members of the Underground Press Syndicate.

1966 establishments in the United States
 
Counterculture of the 1960s
History of Marin County, California
News agencies based in the United States
Newspaper associations
Print syndication